Garelochhead railway station is a railway station serving the village of Garelochhead, on the Gare Loch, in Scotland. This station is on the West Highland Line and is a boundary station for SPT. It is sited  from Craigendoran Junction, near Helensburgh, between Arrochar and Tarbet and Helensburgh Upper. ScotRail manage the station and operate most services, with others provided by Caledonian Sleeper.

History 

This station opened to passengers on 7 August 1894.

The station was laid out with a crossing loop and an island platform. There were sidings on both sides, and a turntable on the west side of the line.

The station was host to a LNER camping coach from 1935 to 1939. A camping coach was also positioned here by the Scottish Region from 1964 to 1967.

Latterly operated by a Wickham diesel railbus, it fell victim to the Beeching Axe in June 1964.

Facilities 
The island platform is equipped with benches, a help point, a car park and bike racks, the latter two located outside the station. The only access to the station is via a subway, some steps and a ramp, so the station does not have step-free access. As there are no facilities to purchase tickets, passengers must buy one in advance, or from the guard on the train.

Passenger volume 

The statistics cover twelve month periods that start in April.

Services 
Monday to Saturday, there are six services to Oban and three to Mallaig (the latter combined with Oban portions, dividing at ), and one service to Fort William (the Highland Caledonian Sleeper, weekday mornings only) northbound. Southbound, there are six services to Glasgow Queen Street High Level and one service to London Euston via Queen Street Low Level & Edinburgh Waverley (the Highland Caledonian Sleeper - does not run on Saturday).

On Sundays, there are two trains northbound to Mallaig, the Caledonian Sleeper to Fort William and one extra to Oban only, plus an extra summer service to Oban; Southbound there are three trains southbound to Glasgow Queen Street. In summer months, the extra summer Sunday service returns to Edinburgh, avoiding Glasgow.

References

Bibliography

External links

RAILSCOT on the West Highland Railway
Video footage of Garelochhead railway station

Railway stations in Argyll and Bute
Former North British Railway stations
Railway stations in Great Britain opened in 1894
Railway stations served by ScotRail
Railway stations served by Caledonian Sleeper
SPT railway stations
James Miller railway stations
Listed railway stations in Scotland
Category B listed buildings in Argyll and Bute